The women's 1500 metres event at the 2008 World Junior Championships in Athletics was held in Bydgoszcz, Poland, at Zawisza Stadium on 11 and 13 July.

Medalists

Results

Final
13 July

Heats
11 July

Heat 1

Heat 2

Heat 3

Participation
According to an unofficial count, 35 athletes from 24 countries participated in the event.

References

1500 metres
1500 metres at the World Athletics U20 Championships
2008 in women's athletics